Sabuesos de Holguín (English: Holguín Hounds) is a baseball team in the Cuban National Series. Based in eastern Holguín province, the Sabuesos have historically been a poor team, but made a surprising run in 2002 to claim their only championship.

Roster

Notable players
 Rafael Castillo (pitcher)
 Osvaldo Fernández (pitcher)
 Oscar Gil (pitcher)
 Jorge Cruz (shortstop)
 Luis Rodríguez Williams
 Juan Pacheco (second base)
 Aroldis Chapman (pitcher)

Baseball teams in Cuba
Holguín